Nibourette is a surname. Notable people with the surname include:

Alex Nibourette (born 1983), Seychellois footballer
Roy Nibourette, Seychellois politician